The Great War Remembrance Race was a European single-day cycle race to be held annually from 2018 which  passed through the Belgian province of West Flanders, organized by Flanders Classics and the organizers of Gent–Wevelgem as a 1.1 event on the UCI Europe Tour. The inaugural edition marked the 100th anniversary of the end of World War I and was held on 24 August 2018 and won by Mihkel Räim. Further editions were intended to safeguard continuing awareness of this historic war.

Future editions of the race were canceled in June, 2019. The organizers cited calendar conflicts and similarities to other races in their decision to not continue the race.

Winners

References

External links

Cycle races in Belgium
Cycle races in France
UCI Europe Tour races
Recurring sporting events established in 2018
2018 establishments in Belgium
2018 establishments in France